The 1994 United States Senate election in Indiana was held November 8, 1994. Incumbent Republican U.S. Senator Richard Lugar was re-elected to a fourth term. Lugar won all but one county.

General election

Candidates
Mary Catherine Barton (New Alliance)
Barbara Bourland (Libertarian)
 Jim Jontz, former U.S. Representative (Democratic)
 Richard Lugar, incumbent U.S. Senator (Republican)

Results

By county 
Lugar won 91 of Indiana's 92 counties, Jontz won only the Democratic stronghold of Lake County.

See also 
 1994 United States Senate elections

References 

1994
Indiana
Senate